General Millar may refer to:

David Millar (RCAF officer) (fl. 1980s–2020s), Royal Canadian Air Force lieutenant general
Edward Alexander Millar (1860–1934), U.S. Army brigadier general
William Millar (British Army officer) (died 1838), British Army lieutenant general

See also
General Miller (disambiguation)